Clay Walker is an American country music artist. His discography comprises eleven studio albums and a greatest hits album, as well as 36 singles. Walker's first four studio albums—Clay Walker, If I Could Make a Living, Hypnotize the Moon and Rumor Has It—are all certified platinum by the RIAA, and his greatest hits album and Live, Laugh, Love are each certified gold by the RIAA. Clay Walker is also certified platinum by the CRIA, while If I Could Make a Living and Hypnotize the Moon are certified gold.

Of his singles, all have charted on Billboard Hot Country Songs, with all but two reaching the top 40. Six hit number one, including his first two single releases, "What's It to You" and "Live Until I Die", both from 1993, as well as "Dreaming with My Eyes Open" (1994), "If I Could Make a Living" (1994), "This Woman and This Man" (1995), and "Rumor Has It" (1997). All except "This Woman and This Man" were also number-one hits on the RPM country singles chart in Canada. Eleven more singles reached the top ten on the US country chart. Ten hits crossed over to the Billboard Hot 100, including two top-40 hits: "You're Beginning to Get to Me" (number 39, 1998–1999) and "The Chain of Love" (number 40, 2000).

Studio albums

1990s

2000s, 2010s, and 2020s

Compilation albums

Extended plays

Singles

1990s

2000s, 2010s, and 2020s

Other charted songs

Videography

Video albums

Music videos

Notes

References

Country music discographies
Discographies of American artists